Meg the Lady is a 1905 melodramatic novel by the British writer Tom Gallon. In 1916 it was adapted into a film of the same title directed by Maurice Elvey.

References

Bibliography
 Goble, Alan. The Complete Index to Literary Sources in Film. Walter de Gruyter, 1999.

1905 British novels
Novels set in England
Novels by Tom Gallon
Melodramas
British novels adapted into films